The 1987 Temple Owls football team was an American football team that represented Temple University as an independent during the 1987 NCAA Division I-A football season. In its fifth season under head coach Bruce Arians, the team compiled a 3–8 record and was outscored by a total of 251 to 154. The team played its home games at Veterans Stadium in Philadelphia. 

The team's statistical leaders included James Thompson with 985 passing yards, Todd McNair with 1,058 rushing yards, Keith Gloster with 411 receiving yards, and placekicker Bill Wright with 60 points scored.

Schedule

References

Temple
Temple Owls football seasons
Temple Owls football